Mirella Parutto (born 1936) is an Italian operatic soprano and later mezzo-soprano.

She began her career at the Teatro alla Scala in Milan, as Elena in Boito's Mefistofele, in 1958, and the following year, appeared for the first time at the Teatro dell'Opera di Roma, as Amelia in Verdi's Un ballo in maschera. She then sang widely in Italy, appearing in Florence, Naples, Parma, 
Genoa, Palermo, Trieste, Venice, Cagliari, Catania, etc. Her roles included Matilde in Guglielmo Tell, Abigail in Nabucco, Leonora in both Il trovatore and La forza del destino, the title role in Aida, Maddalena in Andrea Chénier, etc.

She made guest appearances at the Vienna State Opera, the Teatro Nacional Sao Carlos in Lisbon, the Berlin State Opera, the Bolshoi in Moscow, etc.

In 1965, she turned to mezzo-soprano roles, appearing in Rome, as Adalgisa in Norma, Ulrica in Un ballo in maschera, Marie in Wozzeck. The following year, she appeared in Florence, as Principessa di Bouillon in Adriana Lecouvreur and Ottavia in L'incoronazione di Poppea. Other roles included; Preziosilla, Santuzza, Federica, Amneris.

She made her American debut at the Dallas Opera, as Giovanna in Anna Bolena, in 1968, and appeared at the Teatro Colón in Buenos Aires, as Eboli in Don Carlo, in 1971.

Throughout her career, Parutto worked with some of the greatest conductors such as Tullio Serafin, Gabriele Santini, Antonino Votto, Herbert von Karajan, Lovro von Matačić, Gianandrea Gavazzeni, Vittorio Gui, Nino Sanzogno, Oliviero De Fabritiis.

She can be heard on a few "live recordings" which attest of her wide-ranging voice and dramatic capabilities, notably as Leonora in Il trovatore (1961), opposite Franco Corelli and Ettore Bastianini, under De Fabritiis. After retiring from the stage, she turned to teaching with her husband Antonio Boyer.

Selected recordings

 Verdi – Aida (Aida), Antonino Votto (Milan, 1956)
 Verdi – Nabucco (Abigail), Bruno Bartoletti (Florence, 1961)
 Verdi – Aida (Amneris), Oliviero de Fabritiis (Rome, 1966)
 Verdi – Don Carlo (Eboli), Carlo Franci (Venice, 1969)

Sources
 Operissimo.com

1936 births
People from Pordenone
Italian operatic mezzo-sopranos
Italian operatic sopranos
Living people
20th-century Italian women opera singers